Orlando Trustfull (born 4 August 1970) is a Dutch football manager and a former professional player. He was the assistant manager at Internazionale and was brought in by Frank de Boer. As of the start of the 2017–18 season he joined de Boer as a member of the coaching staff at Crystal Palace. He once again joined Frank de Boer on 14 January 2019 when Trustfull was announced as assistant manager of defending champions Atlanta United in Major League Soccer.

Club career
Trustfull was born in Amsterdam and played as a youth player for De Rivalen, Ajax Amsterdam and Blauw-Wit before signing his first professional contract at HFC Haarlem that played in the Eerste Divisie. The midfielder played 14 matches in his first season and was transferred to fellow Eerste Divisie team SVV Schiedam that merged with Dordrecht '90 a year later. Trustfull was a regular first team player and managed to score his first professional goal in the 1991–92 season.

He spent some time at FC Twente where he scored another goal before he was signed by Feyenoord where he had a hard time gaining his first team position but succeeded in this later.

Trustfull felt he was ready to move on to a foreign country and switched to Sheffield Wednesday in the Premier League, where he played 19 matches and scored three goals in his first season. He struggled with settling in England and decided to return to his native country to play for Vitesse Arnhem, where he played a decent first season, but suffered several injuries in the years after. He ended his career after the 2000–01 season having played 223 professional matches and having scored 24 goals.

International career
Eventually 1994–95 season he succeeded and was even selected for the Netherlands national team twice. He participated in two Euro 96 qualification matches versus Belarus and Malta, which were won 1–0 and 4–0 respectively.

Personal life
Trustfull is married to Dutch television presenter Quinty Trustfull. Their son Malik Trustfull is a football player as well, currently playing in the ranks of the Ajax Youth Academy.

References

Living people
1970 births
Expatriate footballers in England
Association football midfielders
Dutch footballers
Netherlands international footballers
Dutch sportspeople of Surinamese descent
Footballers from Amsterdam
FC Dordrecht players
FC Twente players
Feyenoord players
Sheffield Wednesday F.C. players
SBV Vitesse players
HFC Haarlem players
Eredivisie players
Premier League players
Dutch expatriate footballers
Blauw-Wit Amsterdam players
AFC Ajax non-playing staff
Inter Milan non-playing staff
Crystal Palace F.C. non-playing staff
Dutch expatriate sportspeople in England
Dutch expatriate sportspeople in Italy
Dutch expatriate sportspeople in the United States